Below are the mintage figures for the Washington quarter.

The following mint marks indicate which mint the coin was made at (parentheses indicate a lack of a mint mark):

P = Philadelphia Mint

D = Denver Mint

S = San Francisco Mint

Eagle reverse (1932–1974)

Silver

Clad

Bicentennial reverse

Eagle reverse (1977–1998)

50 State quarters

District of Columbia and United States Territories quarters

District of Columbia

Puerto Rico

Guam

American Samoa

US Virgin Islands

Northern Mariana Islands

America the Beautiful quarters

See also 

 United States cent mintage figures
 Lincoln cent mintage figures
 United States nickel mintage figures
 United States quarter mintage figures
 Kennedy half dollar mintage figures

References 

Twenty-five-cent coins of the United States